Kandace Greer Grammer (born February 15, 1992) is an American actress and former beauty queen. She is best known for her role as Lissa Miller in the MTV series Awkward and for her role in the 2021 Netflix-released film Deadly Illusions.

Early life
Grammer was born on February 15, 1992, in Los Angeles, California to actor Kelsey Grammer and make-up artist Barrie Buckner. Her parents were never married. Through her father, she has three half-sisters: Spencer (born 1983), Mason (born 2001), and Faith (born 2012) and three half-brothers: Jude (born 2004), Gabriel (born 2014), and James (born 2016). She was raised primarily by her mother in Malibu, California. She was named after actress Greer Garson.

Grammer became passionate for theater at a young age, participating in various plays from the age of 5 before competing in pageants as a teenager. She attended Idyllwild Arts Academy for two years, receiving training under their theater program. She graduated from the University of Southern California in June 2014 as a theater major. She is also a member of the Delta Tau chapter of the Kappa Kappa Gamma sorority.

Grammer served as Miss Golden Globe 2015 at the 72nd Golden Globe Awards.

Pageant competitions
Grammer entered her first beauty pageant in 2008, winning the title of Miss Teen Malibu. She went on to place within the top 10 in the Miss California Teen competition. She competed again the following year, successfully retaining her crown and again placing within the Top 10 of the state competition. In 2009, she represented the Marina Del Rey region, placing in the Top 10 of the 2010 state competition for the third year in a row. That year, Grammer also held the title of Miss Regional California Teen 2011.

Grammer competed at the Miss California Teen 2011 competition representing Thousand Oaks. She placed in the Top 10. After this competition, she retired from beauty pageants.

Acting career
Grammer's first acting role was as a guest star on an episode of the Nickelodeon teen series iCarly in 2010. She then went on to star in the independent films Almost Kings, Chastity Bites, and An Evergreen Christmas.

In 2011, Grammer was cast as Lissa Miller in the MTV comedy series, Awkward. She was in a recurring role for the first two seasons before being promoted to a series regular for seasons three, four and five. In 2015, she guest starred as McKenna on Melissa & Joey for three episodes of the final season.

It was announced in June 2015 that Grammer would be starring in the upcoming Lifetime original movie, Manson's Lost Girls, to be released in 2016. In July 2015, it was announced that she would be starring as Summer Roberts in The Unauthorized O.C. Musical, a stage adaptation of the pilot episode of The O.C.

In 2016, Grammer began a recurring role on the ABC sitcom The Middle, playing Axl Heck's girlfriend April. The role lasted until 2017. In 2021, she acted in the thriller drama film, Deadly Illusions.

Filmography

References

External links

1992 births
21st-century American actresses
Actresses from Los Angeles
American film actresses
American television actresses
Beauty pageant contestants from California
Living people
University of Southern California alumni
American people of British descent
American people of United States Virgin Islands descent